Solanum physalifolium, known as hoe nightshade, Argentine nightshade, green nightshade and hairy nightshade, is a species in the family Solanaceae (the nightshade family). Native to Argentina, Bolivia and Chile, it is widely naturalized in Australia, New Zealand, Europe, western Canada and the north western United States. Solanum physalifolium has been widely but incorrectly known as Solanum sarrachoides, a different species. It has been listed as a noxious weed in the US states of Kansas and Michigan under this misapplied name.

Two varieties have been recognized:
 Solanum physalifolium var. nitidibaccatum (Bitter) Edmonds, syn. S. nitidibaccatum Bitter
 Solanum physalifolium var. physalifolium

Description
Solanum physalifolium is an annual herbaceous plant growing from a taproot. There are no leaves at the base of the stem. The leaf margins are variable and may be toothed, untoothed or wavy. Both the stems and leaves have soft hairs, often somewhat sticky.

References

physalifolium